Hafize Şahin (born January 1, 1992) is a Turkish female freestyle wrestler  competing in the 59 kg division. She is a member of the Trakya Birlik SK in Edirne, where she is coached by Habil Kara. She continues her study in physical education and sports at Trakya University, which she began at Aksaray University.

Achievements
She won the bronze medal in the 40 kg division  at the 2007 Black Sea Games in Trabzon, Turkey.

Şahin became silver medalist in the 55 kg event at the 2010 European Junior Wrestling Championships held in Samokov, Bulgaria. She repeated her success with the silver medal at the 2012 European Junior Wrestling Championships held between June 19–24 in Zagreb, Croatia.

Şahin is the holder of two bronze medals won at the World University Championships in Torino, Italy (2010) and Kuortane, Finland (2012).

She captured the gold medal in her weight class at the 2012 Mediterranean Championship for Senior Women's Wrestling held between May 18–20 in Larissa, Greece.

At the 2012 World Junior Wrestling Championships held in Pattaya, Thailand, she became silver medalist in the -59 kg division.

Hafize Şahin won the bronze medal at the 2013 European Wrestling Championships held in Tbilisi, Georgia.

At the 2013 Mediterranean Games, she became gold medalist in the -63 kg division. She was winner of silver medal in the -60 kg division at the 2014 European Wrestling Championships held in Vantaa, Finland.

References

External links
 

1992 births
Place of birth missing (living people)
Living people
Turkish female sport wrestlers
Trakya University alumni
Aksaray University alumni
European Games competitors for Turkey
Wrestlers at the 2015 European Games
Wrestlers at the 2016 Summer Olympics
Olympic wrestlers of Turkey
Mediterranean Games gold medalists for Turkey
Competitors at the 2013 Mediterranean Games
Mediterranean Games medalists in wrestling
European Wrestling Championships medalists
Islamic Solidarity Games medalists in wrestling
Islamic Solidarity Games competitors for Turkey
21st-century Turkish women